Korasb (also Romanized as Korāsb; also known as Korash) is a village in Farim Rural District, Dodangeh District, Sari County, Mazandaran Province, Iran. At the 2006 census, its population was 197, in 56 families.

References 

Populated places in Sari County